Mica Mountain is a 2,855-meter-elevation (9,367-foot) mountain summit located in British Columbia, Canada.

Description
Mica Mountain is situated 12 kilometers (7.5 miles) southwest of Tête Jaune Cache, British Columbia, at the eastern edge of the Premier Range which is a subset of the Cariboo Mountains. The Southern Yellowhead Highway passes the eastern base of the mountain as it traverses Robson Valley. Precipitation runoff from Mica Mountain drains into Tête Creek and the McLennan River. Topographic relief is significant as the summit rises over 1,650 meters (5,400 feet) above the creek in four kilometers (2.5 miles). In good weather the view from the summit includes Mount Robson, Canoe Mountain and Kinbasket Lake. The mountain's well-established local name was officially adopted 23 May 1962 by the Geographical Names Board of Canada. The name refers to the mineral mica which was mined from the higher slopes of the peak in the early 1900s.

Climate
Based on the Köppen climate classification, Mica Mountain is located in a subarctic climate zone with cold, snowy winters, and mild summers. Temperatures in winter can drop below −20 °C with wind chill factors below −30 °C.

See also
 Geography of British Columbia

Gallery

References

External links

 Mica Mountain: weather forecast
 Mica Mountain Mine Trail: trailpeak.com

Cariboo Mountains
Two-thousanders of British Columbia
Cariboo Land District
Robson Valley